Project Canterbury (sometimes abbreviated as PC) is an online archive of material related to the history of Anglicanism. It was founded by Richard Mammana, Jr. in 1999 with a grant from Episcopal Church Presiding Bishop Frank T. Griswold, and is hosted by the non-profit Society of Archbishop Justus. The episcopal patron of the site is Terry Brown, retired bishop of Malaita in the Church of the Province of Melanesia; Geoffrey Rowell Bishop of Gibraltar in Europe had served in this capacity from 1999 until his death. Volunteer transcribers prepare material for the site, which incorporates modern scholarly material, primary source texts, photographic images and engravings.

Imprint 
Since 2018, Project Canterbury is also an imprint of Anglican historical material in printed formats.

Titles 
 Our Aunt: Low Church Observations of American Anglo-Catholicism (New Haven, 2018) 
 Moravians and Anglicans: Ecumenical Sources (Resica Falls, Pennsylvania, 2021) 
 Intercommunion between the Episcopal Church and the Polish National Catholic Church: An Introduction and Sourcebook (Resica Falls, Pennsylvania, 2022)

References

External links

Anglicanism
Discipline-oriented digital libraries
Internet properties established in 1999
Online archives
British digital libraries
1999 establishments in the United Kingdom